The World Savings and Retail Banking Institute is an international banking association. It currently gathers 100 members in 80 countries throughout the world, comprising approximately 6760 savings and retail banks. At the start of 2018, total assets of WSBI members amounted to USD14,000 billion.

WSBI was founded 1924 at the occasion of the First International Thrift Congress in Milan. Until the Second World War the headquarters of the International Savings Banks Institute remained in Milan. But since Milan had suffered from heavy bombings the Institute moved to Amsterdam in 1948.

In 1963, WSBI's sister organization, the 'Savings Banks Group of the European Economic Community' was created to represent European Savings Banks from the merging European markets. This institution was renamed European Savings Banks Group in 1988 and was renamed to European Savings and Retail Banking Group in 2013

The International Savings Banks Institute was again relocated in 1969, this time to Geneva where it remained until 1994 when it was dissolved. In its place, a newly created World Savings Banks Institute (WSBI) was established in Brussels on 9 June 1994. Since then they have changed their name to the World Savings and Retail Banking Institute and European Savings and Retail Banking Group (WSBI-ESBG), and continue to operate under a common secretariat located in Brussels.

WSBI is the global representative of its members, typically savings and retail banks or association thereof, and fosters cooperation between them. An important area of work is financial inclusion, where the organisation has worked with the Bill&Melinda Gates Foundation  and the Mastercard Foundation>

See also
World Bank
World Savings Day
European Savings Bank Group

Notes

References 

http://www.uncdf.org/english/microfinance/pubs/newsletter/pages/2005_08/news_wsbi.php
http://www.dailyindia.com/show/247165.php/Pawan-Kumar-Bansal-to-inaugurate-WSBI-General-Assembly-today
http://www.bnamericas.com/factfile_detail.jsp?idioma=I&documento=16323

External links 
WSBI — World Savings and Retail Banking Institute
ESBG — European Savings and Retail Banking Group

Banking institutes